Korocular  is a village in the Mersin Province, Turkey. It's part of Toroslar district (which is an intracity district within Greater Mersin). It is situated in the southern slopes of the Toros Mountains to the north of the city center. The population of Korucular was 165  as of 2012.

References

Villages in Toroslar District